Jayadev is a Vidhan Sabha constituency of Khordha district, Odisha, India.

This constituency includes Balianta block and Balipatna block.

Elected Members

Only one election was held in 2009.
Elected members from the Jayadev constituency are:

2019: (111): Arabinda Dhali (BJD)
2014: (111): Sashi Bhusan Behera (BJD)
2009: (111): Arabinda Dhali (BJD)

2019 Election Result

2014 Election Result

2009 Election Results
In 2009 election, Biju Janata Dal candidate Arabinda Dhali defeated Independent candidate Narendranath Nayak by a margin of 43,604 votes.

Notes

References

Assembly constituencies of Odisha
Khordha district